Hotel was an AOR group that formed in Birmingham, Alabama, in 1973 and disbanded in 1982.

Early history
After various personnel changes marked their early formative years, the group solidified their lineup in 1976 with original members Marc Phillips on lead vocals/piano and Tommy Calton on guitar/vocals.  Rounding out the most-popular formation of this group were Lee Bargeron on keyboards/acoustic guitar/vocals, Mike Reid on guitar/vocals, George Creasman on bass/vocals, and Michael Cadenhead on drums/vocals, which is the lineup that recorded their 2 MCA studio albums.

Hotel was a popular favorite on the southeastern United States Rock-n-Roll club scene and played in all the best and largest clubs, as well as fronting concerts for many national acts who toured through the area in the mid-to-late 1970s.  Their original songs were highly laced with pop hooks and heavy vocal harmonies, sometimes 6-part.  Their sound was relative to power pop groups such as The Rascals and Raspberries but with a more-polished sound and much-higher musicianship; they routinely peppered their sets with tunes that showed off their musical prowess by covering difficult-to-play songs note-for-note by acts such as Steely Dan. Phillips' lead vocal also gave the group an identifiable trademark that combined a good range with exceptional quality.

Recordings
In 1978, Hotel released a single for Mercury Records, "You'll Love Again."  It reached No. 71 on the Billboard Hot 100, and it was very popular in its regional area where the band toured constantly and built a solid following.

In 1979, they signed with MCA Records and released their debut album.  Simply entitled "Hotel", the album was a collection of pop rock.  MCA released the songs "You've Got Another Thing Coming" which reached No. 54, becoming the band's highest charting single, and "Hold On To The Night", which reached #80 on the Hot 100, penned by Phillips and prolific 1960s songwriter Barry Mann (co-writer of "On Broadway", "You've Lost That Lovin' Feelin'" and many more).

It appeared that by 1980, with popular music moving away from progressive rock, punk rock and disco, these elements would eventually meld themselves into new wave, which combined elements of all these styles using a combination synthesizer and guitar-based sound.  Seeing this change in the music environment taking place, Hotel began work on their second album, Half-Moon Silver, which was released by MCA in 1980.  This second album contained strong AOR and was a bit edgier than the debut album. Its only single release, also titled "Half Moon Silver", reached #72 on the Hot 100. It lacked proper promotion and sold even less than the debut album, which led MCA to drop the act.  The group stayed together to tour the club circuit, but disbanded in 1982.

Later formations
Founding members Marc Phillips and Tommy Calton promptly created the "Calton-Phillips Group", later changing the name to "Split the Dark".  This latter formation created a video which won the "MTV Basement Tapes" competition in November 1986 with 71% of the vote.  Split the Dark disbanded in 1988.

Notably, one of the final members of Split the Dark was guitarist/vocalist Damon Johnson, who later formed the rock group Brother Cane, which had some national success in the 1990s with three albums, including their biggest hit "I Lie in the Bed I Make". Johnson later joined Alice Cooper, Thin Lizzy and Black Star Riders.

George Creasman (born on September 12, 1952) died on June 9, 2020, at age 67.

Marc Phillips (born Marcus Calvin Phillips Jr. on February 28, 1954) died of COVID-19 on January 21, 2021, at age 66.

CD Reissue
In April 2018, UK label Rock Candy Records announced that 'Half Moon Silver' would be officially reissued on CD. Due date expected to be May 2018.

References

Sources
Marc Phillips' website
Tommy Calton's website
GLORYDAZE Music review 'Hotel'
GLORYDAZE Music review 'Halfmoon Silver'

Musical groups established in 1973
Musical groups disestablished in 1982
Musical groups from Birmingham, Alabama
Rock music groups from Alabama